Altagonum paulum is a species of ground beetle in the subfamily Carabinae. It was described by Darlington in 1970. The species is found in Micronesia and New Guinea.

References

paulum
Beetles described in 1970
Beetles of Australia